Alex (1959 – 1 May 2011) was an Indian actor and magician. He appeared in over 100 Tamil films after making his debut in Rajinikanth's production Valli (1993) and won awards for his portrayal of characters in Mitta Miraasu and Kovilpatti Veeralakshmi.

Career 
The state government had conferred the Kalaimamani award on the actor, who also received the state award for the best character award for his performance in Mitta Miraasu (2001). Alex had also worked as an office-bearer of the South Indian Film Artistes' Association. He was in The Guinness Book of World Records and the Limca Book of Records for performing magic non-stop for 24 hours.

He died at a private hospital in Chennai on 1 May 2011 following a brief illness aged 52. He was survived by his wife and two daughters.

Notable filmography

References 

Male actors in Tamil cinema
Television personalities from Tamil Nadu
1959 births
2011 deaths
Tamil Nadu State Film Awards winners
Male actors from Tiruchirappalli
Place of birth missing
20th-century Indian male actors
21st-century Indian male actors